Theatro Technis is an independent  multi-cultural arts centre with a  120 -seat  theatre located    in the heart of London Borough of Camden. It  contributes in general and specific ways to the cultural and   social life  of  the people of  London.

General contribution to the cultural diversity of London. 
 A performance space for  innovative interpretations of  classics, e.g. Shakespeare, Chekov,  and Dostoyevski and other classics by visiting, next generation directors.
 Hosting foreign language productions.
 A platform for  political theatre, most notably The Madness of George Dubya which had been rejected by almost all of London venues. Michael Billington of the Guardian remarked "The most cheering aspect of the year was the varied and rapid response to the Iraq crisis. At Theatro Technis, Justin Butcher wrote and directed The Madness of George Dubya - ignored by most critics until it transferred to the West End."

Specific and historical contribution 
 To serve the “educational and cultural needs” of the Cypriot Greek and Greek communities of the UK, and which was the original raison d`etre by its founder George Eugeniou, and a group of fellow actors and creatives: 1) staging dramas  that explored the socio-economic, immigration and refugee concerns that impact this community, revealing the trauma of the Turkish invasion of Cyprus, the ethnic cleansing that ensued and its tragic aftermath.
 Organizing the annual community festival of “Cyprus Week”
 Hosting the London Greek Film Festival in conjunction with ERT1 tv and the Thessaloniki Film Festival.

History

Originally founded in 1957 by  George Eugeniou and a group of actors five decades ago  Theatro Technis first started its work in an old unused warehouse located in the backyard of King`s Cross . Then after a monumental struggle and continued threats to its existence it finally found its permanent home in an old Church building where it has flourished into a centre of  multi-faceted and multi-cultural activities.

Selection of Productions

 Sophocles Oedipus King
 Prometheus Bound
 Medea (play)
 Lysistrata The Persians Antigone King Lear A Midsummer Night's Dream Macbeth Three Sisters The Idiot Le Petit Prince in French
 La casa de Bernarda Alba in  Spanish
 Kato Apo tis Keratsies by Stavros Lilitos in Greek
 Griselda Gambaro's 'Siamese Twins'
 The Madness of George Dubya by Justin Butcher
 Dowry with Two White Doves 
 Afrodite Unbound The National Engagement A Revolutionary Nicknamed Roosevelt The Best of Tofias Contract Hands Tied, Tied Hand Gringland Searching for the Lemons The Fire Burns where it Falls, and Two Lives Cyprus Trilogy The HoleUK actors of Greek descent  nurtured by Theatro Technis include Andreas Markou, Stelios Kyriacou, Andy Lysandrou, Spyros Kyprianou, Maroula Eugeniou, Peter Polycarpou,  Angelique Rockas, Anna Savva, George Savvides, Jackie Skarvellis.

Educational schemesThe Tasty Plays'' by Scene & Heard, 'a unique mentoring project that sees local kids join forces with volunteer actors, writers and directors to create theatre'. Theatro Technis also offers one year free internships in theatre practice  for aspiring young directors, supervised by George Eugeniou.

The Humanitarian Arm of Theatro Technis
Theatro Technis runs a citizens advisory service for the local Greek Cypriot community as well as the Camden community.

Location
26 Crowndale Rd, London NW1 1TT. Nearest Tube Station : Mornington Crescent

References

External links

Theatre companies in London
Producing house theatres in London
Theatres in the London Borough of Camden